Chile has a growing body of national LGBT+ cinema.

History and society 
In the latter half of the 20th century, Daniel Emilfork, was considered the most prominent Chilean film actor both in Chile and internationally. He resettled in France in 1949, due to homophobic persecution in the country. The star of 2017's A Fantastic Woman, Daniela Vega, was the first transgender person to present at the Oscars.

Homosexuality in Chilean cinema is a subject that is rarely portrayed, with the first openly gay character appearing in 1990, but has been done in a more explicit way in the 21st century — CinemaChile's director Constanza Arena reflected in 2019 that only in the past eight years had filmmaking been able to diversify after dictatorship, giving the example of "the exploration of LGBT issues".

The 2017 release of A Fantastic Woman was said to have "reignited a conversation about trans rights in Chile", and ultimately was a deciding factor in the country passing Gender Identity Laws in 2018 after the filmmakers reportedly took its Oscar to then-President Michelle Bachelet.

Murder of Daniel Zamudio in film

The 2016 film Jesús tells the true story of a young gay man who was beaten to death in a park, matching this with the irony of two of his attackers engaging in gay sex shortly afterwards, with the director saying he wanted to show the complexity of the event and its and the killer's place in society; one of the real killers was also bisexual. He has also said that he would not label the film an LGBT film, because its young sexually-fluid protagonist does not label himself either. Álex Anwandter's Nunca vas a estar solo, released the same year, is based on the same event and also shows the bisexuality of one of the killers, using its narrative to challenge Chileans to look at their homophobia and question its origins. Both films ignore the "neo-nazi" rhetoric about the killers used in the news, to reflect that many regular Chileans held homophobic views.

Films

See also 
 LGBT culture in Chile: Cinema

References 

 
Cinema